Ottoman Greeks were ethnic Greeks who lived in the Ottoman Empire (1299–1922), much of which is in modern Turkey. Ottoman Greeks were Greek Orthodox Christians who belonged to the Rum Millet (Millet-i Rum). They were concentrated in eastern Thrace (especially in and around Constantinople), and western, central, and northeastern Anatolia (especially in Smyrna, Cappadocia, and Erzurum vilayet, respectively). There were also sizeable Greek communities elsewhere in the Ottoman Balkans, Ottoman Armenia, and the Ottoman Caucasus, including in what, between 1878 and 1917, made up the Russian Caucasus province of Kars Oblast, in which Pontic Greeks, northeastern Anatolian Greeks, and Caucasus Greeks who had collaborated with the Russian Imperial Army in the Russo-Turkish War of 1828–1829 were settled in over 70 villages, as part of official Russian policy to re-populate with Orthodox Christians an area that was traditionally made up of Ottoman Muslims and Armenians.

History

Introduction

In the Ottoman Empire, in accordance with the Muslim dhimmi system, Greek Christians were guaranteed limited freedoms (such as the right to worship), but were treated as second-class citizens. Christians and Jews were not considered equals to Muslims: testimony against Muslims by Christians and Jews was inadmissible in courts of law. They were forbidden to carry weapons or ride atop horses, their houses could not overlook those of Muslims, and their religious practices would have to defer to those of Muslims, in addition to various other legal limitations. Violation of these statutes could result in punishments ranging from the levying of fines to execution.

The Ecumenical Patriarch was recognized as the highest religious and political leader (millet-bashi, or ethnarch) of all Orthodox Christian subjects of the Sultan, though in certain periods some major powers, such as Russia (under the Treaty of Küçük Kaynarca of 1774), or Great Britain claimed the rights of protection over the Ottoman Empire's Orthodox subjects.

19th century
The three major European powers, Great Britain, France and Russia (known as the Great Powers), took issue with the Ottoman Empire's treatment of its Christian population and increasingly pressured the Ottoman government (also known as the Sublime Porte) to extend equal rights to all its citizens. Beginning in 1839, the Ottoman government implemented the Tanzimat reforms to improve the situation of non-muslims, although these would prove largely ineffective. In 1856, the Hatt-ı Hümayun promised equality for all Ottoman citizens irrespective of their ethnicity and confession, widening the scope of the 1839 Hatt-ı Şerif of Gülhane. The reformist period peaked with the Constitution, (or Kanûn-ı Esâsî in Ottoman Turkish), which was promulgated on November 23, 1876. It established freedom of belief and equality of all citizens before the law.

20th century

On July 24, 1908, Greeks' hopes for equality in the Ottoman Empire brightened with the removal of Sultan Abd-ul-Hamid II (r. 1876–1909) from power and restored the country back to a constitutional monarchy. The Committee of Union and Progress (more commonly called the Young Turks), a political party opposed to the absolute rule of Sultan Abd-ul-Hamid II, had led a rebellion against their ruler. The pro-reform Young Turks deposed the Sultan and replaced him with the ineffective Sultan Mehmed V (r. 1908–1918).

Before World War I, there were an estimated 1.8 million Greeks living in the Ottoman Empire. Some prominent Ottoman Greeks served as Ottoman Parliamentary Deputies. In the 1908 Parliament, there were twenty-six (26) Ottoman Greek deputies but their number dropped to eighteen (18) by 1914. It is estimated that the Greek population of the Ottoman Empire in Asia Minor had 2,300 community schools, 200,000 students, 5,000 teachers, 2,000 Greek Orthodox churches, and 3,000 Greek Orthodox priests.

From 1914 until 1923, Greeks in Thrace and Asia Minor were subject to a campaign including massacres and internal deportations involving death marches. The International Association of Genocide Scholars (IAGS) recognizes it as genocide and refers to the campaign as the Greek Genocide.

Patriarchate of Constantinople

After the fall of Constantinople in 1453, when the Sultan virtually replaced the Byzantine emperor among subjugated Christians, the Ecumenical Patriarch of Constantinople was recognized by the Sultan as the religious and national leader (ethnarch) of Greeks and the other ethnicities that were included in the Greek Orthodox Millet. The Patriarchate earned a primary importance and occupied this key role among the Christians of the Ottoman Empire because the Ottomans did not legally distinguish between nationality and religion, and thus regarded all the Orthodox Christians of the Empire as a single entity.

The position of the Patriarchate in the Ottoman state encouraged projects of Greek renaissance, centered on the resurrection and revitalization of the Byzantine Empire. The Patriarch and those church dignitaries around him constituted the first centre of power for the Greeks inside the Ottoman state, one which succeeded in infiltrating the structures of the Ottoman Empire, while attracting the former Byzantine nobility.

Identity

The Greeks were a self-conscious group within the larger Christian Orthodox religious community established by the Ottoman Empire. They distinguished themselves from their Orthodox co-religionists by retaining their Greek culture, customs, language, and tradition of education. Throughout the post-Byzantine and Ottoman periods, Greeks, as members of the Ecumenical Patriarchate of Constantinople, declared themselves as Graikoi (Greek: Γραικοί, "Greeks") and Romaioi or Romioi (Greek: Ρωμαίοι/Ρωμηιοί, "Romans").

Notable Ottoman Greeks
Aleksandro Karatodori (1833–1906).
Basil Zaharoff (1850–1936), arms dealer and financier.
Christakis Zografos (1820–1896), banker and benefactor.
Elia Kazan (1909–2003), director, producer, writer and actor.
Elias Venezis (1904–1973), writer from Ayvalık.
Evangelinos Misailides (1820–1890).
Hüseyin Hilmi Pasha (1855–1922), Grand Vizier.
Pargalı Ibrahim Pasha (1494–1536), Grand Vizier to Suleyman the Magnificent.
Kösem Sultan (1589–1651), wife of Ottoman sultan Ahmed I.
Michael Vasileiou, 19th century merchant and benefactor.
Nicholas Mavrocordatos (1670–1730).
Prince Alexander Mavrocordatos (1791–1865), Greek statesman.
Yorgo Zarifi (1810–1884), banker and financier.
Aristotle Onassis (1906–1975), shipping magnate.
Anton Christoforidis (1918–1985), Greek light heavyweight boxer.
Sir Alec Issigonis (1906–1988), Greek-British car designer whose most famous work is the Mini.
Adamantios Korais (1748–1833), Greek humanist scholar
Roza Eskenazi (1890–1980), famous singer.
Rita Abatzi (1914–1969), famous singer.
Giorgos Seferis (1900–1971), Greek poet who was awarded the Nobel Prize in Literature.
Marika Ninou (1918–1957), famous singer.
Giannis Papaioannou (1913–1972), famous singer.
Leonidas Paraskevopoulos (1860–1936) – Greek military man and politician.
Kostas Skarvelis (1880–1942), famous singer.
Matthaios Kofidis (1855-1921), businessman and politician.

Gallery

See also
Asia Minor
Greeks in Turkey
Greek genocide
Greek Orthodox Church
Greek Muslims
Ecumenical Patriarchate of Constantinople
Millet (Ottoman Empire)
Ottoman Empire
Ottoman Armenians
Phanar Greek Orthodox College
Timeline of Orthodoxy in Greece (1453–1821)
Pontic Greeks
Greek Byzantine Catholic Church
List of former mosques in Greece

References

Citations

Sources

 - Profile at Google Books

Further reading

 
Christianity in the Ottoman Empire